Stephen Clifford Derrett (born 16 October 1947) is a Welsh former professional footballer. During his career, he made over 200 appearances in the Football League and won four caps for Wales.

Career

A youth team player at the club, Steve Derrett began his career at Cardiff City, making his first team debut in a European Cup Winners Cup match against NAC Breda in 1967. He went on to make his league debut in November of the same year in a match against Birmingham City and went on to establish himself in the side over the following years, including earning all of his four caps for Wales, two of which ended in heavy defeats against Scotland and Italy.

Derrett left Cardiff in 1972 to join Carlisle United but struggled to settle at Brunton Park and, after a short loan spell at Aldershot, moved on to Rotherham United the following year. He spent three years at Rotherham, making over 80 appearances, before returning to South Wales to sign for Newport County only for a knee injury two years into his spell there to end his professional career.

Honours
Cardiff City

 Welsh Cup Winner: 1
 1968–69

References

1947 births
Living people
Footballers from Cardiff
Welsh footballers
Wales international footballers
Wales under-23 international footballers
Cardiff City F.C. players
Carlisle United F.C. players
Aldershot F.C. players
Rotherham United F.C. players
Newport County A.F.C. players
Barry Town United F.C. players
English Football League players
Association football defenders